Avis Budget Group is American car rental agency holding company headquartered in Parsippany, New Jersey. It is the parent company of several brands including Avis Car Rental, Budget Rent a Car, Budget Truck Rental, Payless Car Rental and Zipcar.

The company also operates several smaller, regional brands including ACL Hire, Apex Car Rentals, AmicoBlue, France Cars, Maggiore Group, MoriniRent, TurisCar and TurisPrime.

It is one of the three big rental car holding companies in the United States, holding a 26% market share, placing it behind both the Hertz Corporation and Enterprise Holdings.

History 
Following the decision to dissolve the Cendant company name and split into four separate companies, the vehicle rental division of Cendant became Avis Budget Group in 2006.

In 2011, Avis Budget Group acquired Avis Europe, an independently-owned company licensee, globally reuniting the Avis and Budget brands.

On September 5, 2012, Avis Budget Group acquired Apex Car Rentals of New Zealand.

On March 14, 2013, Avis Budget Group purchased carsharing company Zipcar for about  million in cash.

On April 9, 2015, Avis Budget Group announced it had completed the acquisition of Maggiore Group, Italy's fourth-largest vehicle rental company.

References

External links 

 
American companies established in 2006
Car rental companies of the United States
Companies based in Morris County, New Jersey
Companies listed on the Nasdaq
Companies in the Dow Jones Transportation Average
Corporate spin-offs
Franchises
Holding companies established in 2006
Holding companies of the United States
Parsippany-Troy Hills, New Jersey
Retail companies established in 2006
Transport companies established in 2006